High Spirits is a collection of short stories by Canadian novelist, playwright, critic, journalist and professor Robertson Davies. It was first published by Penguin Canada in 1982

Robertson Davies was Master of Massey College at the University of Toronto in Toronto, Ontario from 1963 until 1981. Shortly after founding the College, he decided that he would tell a ghost story at the College's annual Christmas party — its Gaudy Night — as an entertainment. The telling of a ghost story became a tradition, and for eighteen years Davies wrote a new story, which he read out at the Gaudy Night celebration.

After Davies' retirement from Massey College, the eighteen stories were collected and published in the book High Spirits.

Contents 
 "How the High Spirits Came About, A Chapter of Autobiography"
 "Revelation from a Smoky Fire"
"The Ghost Who Vanished by Degrees"
"The Great Queen is Amused"
"The Night of the Three Kings"
"The Charlottetown Banquet"
"When Satan Comes Home for Christmas"
"Refuge of Insulted Saints"
"Dickens Digested"
"The Kiss of Krushchev"
"The Cat that Went to Trinity"
"The Ugly Spectre of Sexism"
"The Pit Whence Ye Are Digged"
"The Perils of the Double Sign"
"Conversations with the Little Table"
"The King Enjoys His Own Again"
"The Xerox in the Lost Room"
"Einstein and the Little Lord"
"Offer of Immortality"

Reception
Dave Langford reviewed High Spirits for White Dwarf #52, and stated that "It's the best collection since M. R. James in this narrow genre of donnish, tongue-in-cheek ghost stories."

Reviews
Review by Douglas E. Winter (1984) in SF & Fantasy Review, March 1984
Review by Rosemary Pardoe (1984) in Ghosts & Scholars #6, 1984
Review [French] by Luc Pomerleau (1985) in Solaris, #59

References

External links 
 
University of Toronto Quarterly 
Washington Post, Montreal Gazette
Wall Street Journal
Boston Phoenix
Canadian Literature

1982 short story collections
Short story collections by Robertson Davies
World Fantasy Award-winning works